Sewing with Nancy is an American television show about sewing, hosted by Nancy Zieman. It made its debut on the now-defunct Satellite Program Network (SPN, later Tempo Television) in September 1982. On September 1, 1982, PBS began airing the series, which was distributed by National Educational Telecommunications Association. As of 2011, the show aired on 89% of Public Television stations in the United States. It was the longest-running sewing series in the history of North American television.

Sewing with Nancy was co-produced by Wisconsin Public Television at Vilas Hall on the University of Wisconsin campus in Madison. Zieman had Bell's palsy, a one-sided facial nerve paralysis, and talked about the condition on an episode in 2011. On September 5, 2017, Zieman announced her retirement due to cancer; she died just over two months later, the day after the final episode was broadcast. Older episodes continue to be broadcast on PBS under the name The Best of Sewing with Nancy.

References

External links
Sewing with Nancy at Wisconsin Public Television

Sewing
PBS original programming
Arts and crafts television series
1980s American television series
1990s American television series
2000s American television series
2010s American television series
1982 American television series debuts
2017 American television series endings
Television series by WTTW